The Evangelical Lutheran Church in Malawi is an Evangelical Lutheran church in Malawi. It has a membership of 100,000, and has been a member of the Lutheran World Federation since 1988. It is also affiliated with its regional expression, the Lutheran Communion in Southern Africa. The church's head is Bishop Joseph P. Bvumbwe.

References

Lutheranism in Africa
Protestantism in Malawi
Lutheran World Federation members